Alexandre Salimbeni (11 December 1867 - 1942) was an Italian physician and biologist born in Acquapendente.

He studied medicine at the University of Siena, where he later became a professor of pathological anatomy. From 1895 he performed studies in the laboratory of Elie Metchnikoff (1845-1916) at the Pasteur Institute in Paris, where he worked closely with Jules Bordet (1870-1961). In 1900 he served as préparateur under Amédée Borrel (1867-1936) in the laboratory of microbiology courses.

In 1901-03 with Paul-Louis Simond (1858-1947) and Émile Marchoux (1862-1943), he conducted research of yellow fever in Brazil. With Marchoux, he identified Argas persicus as the vector of avian spirochaetosis.

In 1910 he participated on a mission to Russia, where he studied cholera, tuberculosis and the plague. In 1918 he was appointed director of "vaccine services" at the Pasteur Institute.

References 
  Archives de l'Institut Pasteur (biography)

Italian microbiologists
1867 births
1942 deaths
People from Acquapendente
Academic staff of the University of Siena